Oregon Route 212 is an Oregon state highway that serves the eastern Portland metro area. It is an east–west route, running between Boring and Clackamas.

Route description

OR 212 begins at Interstate 205 and OR 213 in Clackamas and heads east as a four lane highway. This section of OR 212 is part of the Clackamas Highway No. 171. The highway then condenses down to two lanes and continues east heading toward Damascus. This section of OR 212 is the Clackamas-Boring Highway No. 174 (see Oregon highways and routes). Along the way, there are numerous intersections with backroads that lead to Gresham, Portland's biggest eastern suburb. The sides of this route are covered in farms and berry fields. It then enters the town of Boring, remaining as a two lane road and reaches its eastern terminus at an interchange with US 26, northwest of Sandy.

History
A previous alignment through Boring ran due west onto Fireman Way, curving south onto 272nd.

Two junctions with 257th Ave give away an old alignment.  OR 212 traveled due west on the eastern junction with 257th, curving south to meet the western junction.

Armstrong Circle at 172nd is a previous alignment.

Before the construction of I-205, OR 212 continued west on a shared alignment with OR 213 to Oregon City.  There, it crossed the Willamette River into West Linn and continued west to Tualatin where it eventually terminated at an intersection with OR 99W.  This section replaced the original Oregon Route 244, but was eventually decommissioned after I-205 was completed; however the entire route can still be driven (other than a now-closed bridge across the Clackamas River which used to connect Oregon City with Gladstone, Oregon).

Before US 26 was rerouted, it used to run on Orient Drive.  OR 212 traveled this brief segment of Compton Road before the US 26 realignment shortened it.

Major intersections

References

212
Transportation in Clackamas County, Oregon